John Henry Clarke (1853 – 24 November 1931) was an English classical homeopath. He was also, arguably, the highest profile anti-Semite of his era in Great Britain. He led The Britons, an anti-Semitic organisation. Educated at the University of Edinburgh, he received his medical degree in 1877.

As a physician Clarke had his own clinic in  Piccadilly, London, but he also was a consultant at the London Homeopathic Hospital and did research into new homeopathic remedies.

Politics
Clarke was a leading advocate of anti-Semitism and served as president of The Britons from its formation in 1919 until his death as an associate of Henry Hamilton Beamish. He wrote several articles on Christianity that have a militant bent. When Beamish became a fugitive and fled England, Clarke became the head of The Britons, and formed with two others a splinter organization, the Britons Publishing Society.

Works
For many years, he was the  editor of The Homeopathic World.  He wrote many books, his best known were Dictionary of Practical Materia Medica and Repertory of Materia Medica (i.e., the Clinical Repertory), both of which are recommended by the U.S. Food and Drug Administration's rules on "Conditions under Which Homeopathic Drugs May be Marketed".

List of homeopathic books by Clarke
A Dictionary of Domestic Medicine and Homeopathic Treatment
Catarrh, Colds and Grippe
Cholera, Diarrhea and Dysentery
Clinical Repertory
Clinical Repertory (Indian edition)
Constitutional Medicine
Dictionary of Practical Materia Medica, 3 volumes (British edition)
Dictionary of Practical Materia Medica, 3 volumes (Indian edition)
Diseases of Heart and Arteries
Grand Characteristics of Materia Medica
Gunpowder As A War Remedy
Hahnemann and Paracelsus
Homeopathy Explained
Indigestion-Its Causes and Cure
Non-Surgical Treatment of Diseases of Glands and Bones
Prescriber
Prescriber (Indian edition)
Radium As An Internal Remedy
The Revolution in Medicine
The Therapeutics of Cancer
Therapeutics of the Serpent Poisons
Tumours
Un Diccionario De Materia Médica Practica (3 volumes)
Whooping Cough

List of anti-Semitic books by Clarke
Call of the Sword
(London: Financial News, 1917)

England Under the Heel of the Jew
(London: C. F. Roworth, 1918)

The British Library has the following informative catalog entry on subsequent imprints of the above:
System number    	 001142406
Title   	         England under the Heel of the Jew: a tale of two books
viz. “The Jews and Modern Capitalism”, by Werner Sombart, and
“A Thousand Million Pounds”
by W. E. Bleloch and A. E. O'Flaherty.
Arranged by the author of “The Call of the Sword” [John Henry Clarke].
Second edition.
Publisher:	London: “The Britons”, 1921.
Physical descr.   	pp. 90; 8º.
Added name   	CLARKE, John Henry, Physician to the London Homeopathic Hospital.

Related item   	England under the Heel of the Jew: a tale of two books
viz. “The Jews and Modern Capitalism”, by Werner Sombart,
and “A Thousand Million Pounds”, by W. E. Bleloch and A. E. O'Flaherty.
Arranged by the author of “The Call of the Sword” [John Henry Clarke].
pp. 111. C. F. Roworth: London, 1918. 8º.

Related item   	Other edition available: England under the Heel of the Jew: a tale of two books
viz. “The Jews and Modern Capitalism”, by Werner Sombart,
and “A Thousand Million Pounds”, by W. E. Bleloch and A. E. O'Flaherty.
Arranged by the author of “The Call of the Sword” [John Henry Clarke].

See also
 Domestic medicine
 On Homeopathy
 List of important homeopaths
 On Anti-Semitism
 The Britons
 Henry Hamilton Beamish 
 Protocols of the Elders of Zion

References

Further reading
 Gisela C. Lebzelter Political Anti-Semitism in England 1918–1939 (New York: Holmes & Meier Publishers, Inc., 1978) ; (London: Macmillan, in association with St. Antony's College, Oxford, 1978) 
Colin Holmes (British historian) Anti-Semitism in British Society (New York: Holmes & Meier Publishers, 1979) 
Colin Holmes (British historian) "New Light on the Protocols of Zion" in Patterns of Prejudice Vol. 11, No. 6 (November–December 1977), pp. 13–21
Colin Holmes (British historian) "The Protocols of Zion of The Britons" in Patterns of Prejudice Vol. 12, No. 6 (November–December 1978), pp. 13–19

External links
 
 Materia Medica by John Henry Clarke, full book

1853 births
1931 deaths
English fascists
19th-century English medical doctors
English non-fiction writers
British homeopaths
English male non-fiction writers
Antisemitism in the United Kingdom
19th-century English male writers